Amphidromus xiengensis is a species of air-breathing land snail, a terrestrial pulmonate gastropod mollusk in the family Camaenidae.

Distribution 
Distribution of Amphidromus xiengensis include Sakaeo Province, Chiang Mai Province and Phayao Province in Thailand, Lao Mountains in Cambodia and Champasak Province, Oudomxay Province and Luang Prabang Province in Laos.

Description

References

External links 

xiengensis
Gastropods described in 1891